The Magus is a 1968 British mystery film directed by Guy Green.  The screenplay was written by John Fowles, based on his 1965 novel of the same name.  It starred Michael Caine, Anthony Quinn, Candice Bergen and Anna Karina.

Plot 
Nicholas Urfe is a young Englishman, who has taken a teaching position on the Greek island of Phraxos, following the previous instructor's suicide. For Nicholas, it is a chance to sample different surroundings and an opportunity to escape from a relationship with his emotionally unstable lover Anne.

At first, Nicholas' life on Phraxos is uneventful but peaceful. However, he soon becomes involved with a reclusive man named Maurice Conchis, who owns an estate on the opposite side of the island, and has a beautiful young woman named Lily as his companion. On being introduced to the couple, Nicholas' life begins to unravel, and he tries to find out who the mysterious Conchis really is.

Is he a psychiatrist? A film producer? A Nazi sympathiser? Or a magician who controls the lives and destinies of those around him? Nicholas quickly begins to lose his grip on reality, sinking deeper into Conchis's game.

During visits to Conchis's estate, Nicholas has a series of experiences which gradually become more unexpected and bizarre. Many are related to (or are re-enactments of) past events from Conchis's life. Ultimately, these events begin happening off the estate as well at unexpected times and places, raising questions as to how much power and control Conchis can actually exercise over others' lives.

The story climaxes with a "trial" directed by Conchis, with Nicholas (and many others) participating.

The final scene, which may be interpreted as a coda, concerns Nicholas' relationship with Anne, and whether or not it will continue.

Cast
 Michael Caine as Nicholas Urfe
 Anthony Quinn as Maurice Conchis
 Candice Bergen as Lily
 Anna Karina as Anne
 Paul Stassino as Meli
 Julian Glover as Anton
 Takis Emmanuel as Kapetan
 George Pastell as Andreas and the Priest
 Danièle Noël as Soula

The film's writer John Fowles has a minor role as a boat captain.

Reception
The film was a critical disaster. Fowles was extremely disappointed with it, although he had written the screenplay himself, and laid most of the blame on director Guy Green. Michael Caine said that it was one of the worst films he had been involved in along with The Swarm and Ashanti because no one knew what it was all about. Candice Bergen said in an interview about the film: "I didn't know what to do and nobody told me. I couldn't put together the semblance of a performance." When Peter Sellers was asked whether he would make changes in his life if he had the opportunity to do it all over again, he jokingly replied, "I would do everything exactly the same except I wouldn't see The Magus.".

Despite the film's failure, it was nominated for a BAFTA Award for Best Cinematography (Billy Williams) and retained a cult following.

Box office
According to Fox records, the film required $7 million in rentals to break even, and by 11 December 1970, it had made $2,450,000, resulting in a loss to the studio.

Home media
The film was released to DVD by 20th Century Fox on 16 October 2006, marking the first time that it has ever been available on home video in the U.S.

References

External links 
 
 

1968 films
British mystery films
British fantasy films
Films based on British novels
Films based on works by John Fowles
Films directed by Guy Green
Films set in Greece
Films set on islands
Films set in the Mediterranean Sea
Films shot in Mallorca
Films scored by John Dankworth
1960s English-language films
1960s British films